Danaher Corporation is an American globally diversified conglomerate with its headquarters in Washington, D.C. The company designs, manufactures, and markets professional, medical, industrial, and commercial products and services. The company's 3 platforms are "Life Sciences", "Diagnostics", and "Environmental & Applied Solutions".

Danaher is ranked 130th on the Fortune 500 2021.

The company is named after Danaher Creek in Western Montana. Founders Steven M. Rales and Mitchell Rales first conceptualized the company while fishing there. Danaher was one of the first companies in North America to adopt "Kaizen" principles to manufacturing, which is a lean manufacturing Japanese philosophy of continuous improvement, and elimination of waste.

History
The company was organized in 1969 as a Massachusetts real estate investment trust under its former name DMG, Inc. In 1978, DMG, Inc. was reorganized as a Florida corporation and changed its name to Diversified Mortgage Investors, Inc. Eventually, the company adopted the name Danaher in 1984 and was reincorporated under the Delaware General Corporation Law. In June 1986, Danaher purchased Chicago Pneumatic (CP), which had merged in July 1984 with a sister company, The Jacobs Manufacturing Co. (Jacobs), and which had purchased Matco Tools Corp. (MTC) in April 1981.

Danaher in June 1987 sold CP while retaining Jacobs, including its Matco Tools Division. Jacobs' name was changed to Matco Tools Corp. in November 1991, and the other divisions within Jacobs were established as separate operating companies. In January 1993, Danaher formed NMTC, Inc., which acquired a substantial portion of the assets of MTC, including the existing distributorship agreements of MTC.

Within two years of Danaher Corp.'s founding in 1984, Danaher Corp. acquired 12 companies as part of a strategy to enter the manufacturing business. Therefore, in 1986 Danaher added Qualitrol to its instrumentation unit. The unit also included Gilbarco Veeder-Root's underground fuel storage sensors, Dynapar's motion sensors and Qualitrol's pressure and temperature measurement instruments, used on the electrical transformer industry.

The Danaher Motion group acquired Kollmorgen, of Radford, Virginia.

1990–2000 
1990 Danaher acquires Easco Hand Tools Inc.
1991 Danaher is selected as exclusive supplier of handtools for Sears.
1994 Danaher acquires the tool company Armstrong- makers of tool brands Armstrong, Allen, and others. 
In 1995 Danaher acquired German components manufacturer Hengstler, a leading manufacturer of counters, printers, relays, and high-precision rotational sensors. Hengstler was Danaher's first acquisition on the European mainland, and the first Operating Company headquartered outside the United States. Since 1999, Danaher has owned 100% of Hach, broadening the portfolio of chemical, mainly water and wastewater, analytics also with the German company Lange.

2004–2006 
Danaher acquired Trojan Technologies, an environmental engineering firm, in 2004.

UK-based West Instruments provides control and measurement instrumentation and services for the global industrial and process markets. German instrumentation manufacturer PMA was added to the Industrial Controls Group in 2005 and enhances the range of control and measurement instrumentation.

In July 2005, Danaher announced a definitive agreement to acquire Leica Microsystems. Leica manufactures a broad range of products for numerous applications requiring microscopic imaging, measurement and analysis. It also offers management systems in the areas of Life Science including biotechnology and medicine, as well as the science of raw materials and industrial quality assurance.

2007–2008 
In early 2007 Danaher acquired Australian Pathology Instrument and Engineering company Vision Systems Limited. Also in 2007, Danaher made its largest acquisition to date, the purchase of Tektronix, Inc. for US$2.85 billion.

ChemTreat was acquired by Danaher in 2007 as well.

2009–2010 
In 2009 Danaher purchased the Analytical Technologies business unit of Canadian Life Sciences company MDS, Inc. for US$650 million. In a separate, but related transaction, Danaher agreed with Life Technologies Corporation (Nasdaq: LIFE) to acquire the remaining 50% ownership position in AB SCIEX for US$450 million, leaving Danaher as outright owner of AB SCIEX and Molecular Devices. The aggregate purchase price for the combined transactions is $1.1 billion.

2011–2012 
In 2011, Danaher acquired Beckman Coulter and sold Accu-sort to Datalogic.

In October 2012, Danaher Corporation and Cooper Industries agreed to sell their joint venture, Apex Tool Group, to Bain Capital for a fee of around $1.6 billion. In December 2012 Danaher Corporation acquired Navman Wireless, a provider of on-demand fleet and asset management technology.

2013–2014 
In September 2014, Danaher Corp announced its intention to buy Nobel Biocare for $2.2 billion. In October 2014, Danaher Corp announced it would be combining its communications unit with NetScout Systems. The action was completed in July 2015

2015–2016 
In May 2015, Danaher Corp announced the acquisition of Pall Corporation for $13.8 billion, which was completed in August 2015.

In June 2016, Danaher spun off several subsidiaries, including Matco and AMMCO-COATS, to create Fortive. In September of the same year, the company announced it would acquire Cepheid for $4 billion (including debt).

In October 2016, Danaher Corporation acquired Phenomenex for $700 million to expand its life sciences space.

2017–present 
In October 2017, Danaher announced the acquisition of scientific informatics company ID Business Solutions Ltd. (IDBS). It was announced that IDBS would become part of Danaher's Life Sciences platform.

In 2017, Danaher recorded $18.3 billion in revenue.

In March 2018, the business announced it would acquire Integrated DNA Technologies for an undisclosed price.

In July 2018, Danaher announced its intention to spin off its $2.8 billion Dental segment into an independent publicly traded company. They named Amir Aghdaei, who at the time was President of Danaher's Dental Platform, to be President and CEO of the new company upon completion of the transaction.  The corporate spin-off was completed in December 2019, with the new company called Envista Holdings Corporation.

In October 2019, Danaher announced it has signed an agreement to sell its biomolecular characterization, chromatography hardware and resins, microcarriers and particle validation standards businesses to Sartorius AG for approximately $750 million. The combined revenue of the businesses was approximately $140 million in 2018.

In 2019, Danaher was ranked by Forbes as one of the best employers for diversity.

On Monday, March 2, 2020, Dr. Stephen Hahn, the F.D.A.’s commissioner, said that the agency had taken actions to allow private labs and companies to begin making their own coronavirus tests in order to greatly expand the U.S. capacity to test for the virus. Dr. Hahn went on to note, "There will be — the estimates we’re getting from industry right now, by the end of this week, close to a million tests will be able to be performed." The following morning, a spokeswoman for the U.S. Department of Health and Human Services noted that Dr. Hahn was referring to tests being produced by an outside manufacturer, Integrated DNA Technologies. IDT is a division of Danaher which was acquired in early 2019.

In March 2020, Danaher acquired the biopharma business of the General Electric Life Sciences division for $21.4 billion and was named Cytiva. The unit makes equipment for the research and manufacture of pharmaceuticals.

In May 2020, it was announced that Tom Joyce would retire as CEO of the company. He was replaced by Executive Vice President Rainier Blair on September 1, 2020.

In September 2022, it was announced that Pall Life Sciences will be merging with Cytiva to create a new Biotechnology Group within Danaher. 

Danaher is set to spin-off its Environmental & Applied Solutions segment by Q4 2023. On February 8, 2023, Danaher announced that the new company is named Veralto Corporation and will be headed by Danaher Executive Vice President Jennifer Honeycutt as President and CEO.

Divisions

Environmental & Applied Solutions 
(to be spun-off as Veralto by Q4 2023)
Esko
Hach
X-Rite
Pantone
Foba Laser Alltec GmbH
Videojet
Laetus GmbH
ChemTreat
Trojan Technologies
ChemTreat
LINX
Aquatic Informatics

Life Sciences 
Aldevron
Cytiva
Beckman Coulter Life Sciences
Integrated DNA Technologies
Leica Microsystems
Molecular Devices
Pall Corporation
Phenomenex
Precision Nanosystems
SCIEX

Diagnostics 
Beckman Coulter Diagnostics
Cepheid
HemoCue
Leica Biosystems
Radiometer
Mammotome
Source:

Former operating companies

Fortive (formerly Test & Measurement segment) 

 Fluke Corporation
 Qualitrol
 Tektronix
 Kollmorgen
 Jacobs Vehicle Systems
 Matco Tools (now part of Vontier Corporation)
 Teletrac (now part of Vontier Corporation)
 Gilbarco (now part of Vontier Corporation)

Envista (formerly Dental segment) 

 KaVo
 Kerr
 Ormco
 Nobel Biocare

Other former operating companies 
Armstrong Tools
Dynapar
Gems Sensors & Controls
Hengstler
Joslyn Clark

See also
Condition-based maintenance
Partial Discharge
Dissolved gas analysis
Electric power transmission
Electric power distribution

References

External links

 
1969 establishments in Washington, D.C.
American companies established in 1969
Companies listed on the New York Stock Exchange
Conglomerate companies established in 1969
Conglomerate companies of the United States
Electronics companies established in 1969
Hand tools
Manufacturing companies based in Washington, D.C.
Multinational companies headquartered in the United States
Tool manufacturing companies of the United States
Electric motor manufacturers